Andrew Brown (born 26 April 1981) is a former Scotland international rugby league footballer who played in the 2000s. He played at club level for the Fife Lions.

Background
Andy Brown was born in Canberra, Australia, he has Scottish ancestors, and eligible to play for Scotland due to the grandparent rule.

International honours
Andy Brown won caps for Scotland while at Fife Lions in 2004 against Wales (sub), in 2005 against Wales (2 matches) (sub).

References

External links
(archived by web.archive.org) Club History - A History Of The Lions
(archived by archive.is) Club History - A History Of The Lions

1981 births
Living people
Australian people of Scottish descent
Fife Lions players
Rugby league players from Canberra
Rugby league props
Scotland national rugby league team players